Beled Hawo ( or ) is a business town in Gedo, Somalia.  Beledxaawo is a border town & business gateway to Kenya and Ethiopia. The town is also the business headquarters of Gedo Region.

References

Populated places in Gedo